Beagle Bay is a medium-sized Aboriginal community on the western side of the Dampier Peninsula, north of Broome in the Kimberley region of Western Australia.

Background
The community is situated adjacent to the Indian Ocean. Beagle Bay is the gateway to communities further north such as Djarindjin, Lombadina, Bobieding and Ardyaloon. The main access road from Broome is unpaved and so becomes inaccessible during the wet season, although it remains connected to other towns on the peninsula to the north by a bitumenised road.

History
The community was established by Trappist monks around 1890. Beagle Bay has a history of caring for stolen children.  In 1884, the first priest arrived to serve the Catholics in the Kimberley, and to try to convert the Aboriginal people. Bishop Matthew Gibney founded the Beagle Bay mission, developed in the land of the Nyul Nyul people; this became a site for the Aboriginal people in 1890. The first Catholic school was established by the Trappist Fathers at Beagle Bay in 1892. In 1895, the Trappist monks of Sept-Fons in France extended their missionary work from Beagle Bay to Broome. In 1901, Pallottine fathers from Germany took over the Beagle Bay Mission with two priests and four brothers. In 1907, the St John of God Sisters began to run a mission school at Beagle Bay and in 1918 the famous church was opened. It features a pearl shell altar which is now a tourist attraction. The Beagle Bay Mission subsequently became home to Indigenous people from across the Kimberley and further afield. Lawman and artist Butcher Joe Nangan lived and worked at the mission from around 1920 to the 1960s.

In her autobiography, Last Truck Out, Betty Lockyer recalls the Beagle Bay mission in the 1940s as a "Garden of Eden", in which "The men had their jobs to do, each going to their own workplace, whether it was the bakery, gardens or checking the windmills. The women stayed at home to look after the babies and little ones ... There was no such thing as idle hands."

Author and ethnographer Daisy Bates began her life's work at Beagle Bay Mission in the early 1900s. Her accounts were among the first attempts at a serious study of Aboriginal Australian culture. Her Native Tribes of Western Australia is a detailed collection about Aboriginal people of Western Australia, and she did extensive work on Aboriginal languages. Her questionnaires, which were recorded on about 4,000 pages of typescripts, created a vast collection of over 23,000 pages of wordlists of Australian Aboriginal languages, which are now digitised.

Education
Beagle Bay Community has a school, Sacred Heart School, which caters for students from ages K-10. The school was established in 1892 by the Trappist monks.

Facilities

Electricity supply

Electricity is generated and supplied locally by Horizon Power and comprises the Australian standard three phase 415/240 volts system 24 hours a day. There are frequent power surges and interruptions.

Water

There are two bores which pump into the ground tank. A transfer pump station then pumps the water into the high level tank.

Cemetery

The community has a functioning cemetery. As per Aboriginal custom it is insensitive to mention the name of deceased persons. The Shire of Broome Health Regulations stipulate that bodies must be buried at least six feet below ground level; however, this cannot be achieved at the Beagle Bay cemetery because the ground water level is too high.

Sewerage

There is a sewer system in place in the community which comprises three pump stations and treatment ponds on the eastern outskirts of the community.

Recreation
The community has basketball courts and an Australian rules football oval. Beagle Bay fields a team in the West Kimberley Football Association called the "Beagle Bay (Peninsular) Bombers".

Bush walking, some fishing and camping are the dominant pursuits for tourists visiting. Visitors are required to apply for a permit prior to entering the Community.

Shopping
There is one store in town owned and operated by Outback Stores on behalf of the local Community. All items are very expensive compared to major centres.
There is also a locally owned and operated bakery/takeaway.
Mechanical repairs may be effected at the mechanical workshop.

Governance
The community is managed through its incorporated body, Billard Aboriginal Corporation, incorporated under the Aboriginal Councils and Associations Act 1976 on 19 April 1996.

Town planning
Beagle Bay Layout Plan No. 1 has been prepared in accordance with State Planning Policy 3.2 (Aboriginal Settlements). Layout Plan No. 1 was endorsed by the community on 15 November 2012 and the Western Australian Planning Commission on 28 May 2013. The Layout Plan map-set and background report can be viewed at Planning Western Australia official site.

References

Further reading
 "Also known as: Nôtre Dame du Sacré Coeur (1890-1901), Sacred Heart Mission, Herz Jesu Mission." Gives quite a detailed history.

External links
Beagle Bay Tourism
Sacred Heart School, Beagle Bay
Office of the Registrar of Indigenous Corporations

Australian Aboriginal missions
Stolen Generations institutions
Aboriginal communities in Kimberley (Western Australia)